Compassion in World Farming (CIWF) is a campaigning and lobbying animal welfare organisation.  It campaigns against the live export of animals, certain methods of livestock slaughter, and all systems of factory farming.  It has received celebrity endorsements and been recognized by BBC Radio 4 for its campaigning. It has grown to a global movement with partners and supporters concerned about the welfare of farm animals.

History 
Peter Roberts, a Hampshire dairy farmer, founded Compassion in World Farming (CIWF) in 1967.  After he realized there was public support, Roberts unsuccessfully appealed to contemporary animal welfare groups to campaign against factory farming.  Undeterred, Roberts began his own campaign.  Roberts retired in 1991.  He was replaced as Chief Executive by Joyce D'Silva, who served until 2005 and now serves as ambassador.  Philip Lymbery, co-author of Farmageddon, is the current Chief Executive.  CIWF has offices in the UK, Italy, Netherlands, France, Poland, the United States, Brussels and China.  Representatives are located in Czech Republic, Spain, Germany, South Africa, and Sweden.  CIWF was responsible for the veal crate ban in the UK, as well as bans on narrow stalls and chains on pregnant sows.  The European Union recognised animals as sentient beings as a result of their petition.

Activism 
Compassion in World Farming does not support violence or threats; rather, it campaigns peacefully for the humane treatment of farm animals, which members accept will be killed and eaten. The London Evening Standard has called it "the most rational of the groups that campaign about animal welfare and the environment." In addition to advocacy, it produces educational material for school children, and has fought against what it calls industry-sponsored propaganda. To celebrate and promote good animal welfare practices, it presents awards including the Good Egg, Good Chicken, Good Dairy, and Good Pig. Its undercover investigations have revealed animal cruelty to hens, cattle, pigs, and sheep.

CIWF advocates free range systems, but accepts straw-bedded indoor systems for pigs. It has warned about factory farming of dairy cattle, which it says is neither economically beneficial for farmers nor healthy for cows. It has advocated a complete ban on fur farming in Ireland, which it describes as "one of the most serious animal welfare problems facing Ireland today". In 2002, it called for a global moratorium on all experimental or commercial cloning of farm animals. It opposes the practice of live export of farm animals for slaughter, instead advocating that the animals be slaughtered before transport. In support of this position, its supporters have demonstrated in London, Ipswich, Belfast, Ramsgate, and Dover. It has also campaigned to maintain a ban on the live transport of horses. It supports a ban on foie gras, calling this "an example of intensive farming at its worst".

Celebrity supporters have included Joanna Lumley, who spoke against long distance animal transport, and Paul McCartney, who advocated for reduced consumption of meat products.  In 2010, Jo Brand, Bill Oddie, Zac Goldsmith, Marc Abraham, and William Roache endorsed CIWF's protest against factory farming of cattle by Nocton Dairies.  Early supporters include Spike Milligan and Celia Hammond, who protested against battery cages.

Awards 
In 2007, CIWF won the BBC Radio 4 Food and Farming Award for the best food campaigner/educator. In 2009, it won the Broadcast Digital Award for Best Use of Interactive for their Chicken Out! website. In 2011, it won a Third Sector Excellence Award for its annual review and The Observers Ethical Award for Campaigner of the Year.

See also
 List of animal welfare organizations

References

External links 
 
 

1967 establishments in the United Kingdom
Animal charities based in the United Kingdom
Animal welfare organisations based in the United Kingdom
Godalming
Organisations based in Surrey
Organizations established in 1967